Speakeasy is the second studio album by Australian acid jazz band D.I.G. and was released in September 1995. The album peaked at number 8 on the ARIA charts.

At the APRA Music Awards of 1996, the single "Futures" won the Most Performed Jazz Work.

Track listing
 Disc 1
 "Hot Cakes" - 5:47
 "Futures" - 3:37
 "Third Stroke" - 3:50
 "You Get the Crime" - 4:15
 "The Last Minute" - 4:16
 "First Steps"	- 5:52
 "History? (Is This the End of)" - 5:58
 "Same Like B3" - 2:49
 "Klunky" - 4:45
 "Fringe Dweller" - 6:23
 "Merlin's Muse" - 4:21

 Disc 2 - Live at the Basement
 "History" - 5:59
 "Sweet Thing"	 - 9:00
 "Klunky" - 8:37
 "Pythonicity" - 10:31
 "Fringe Dweller" - 9:00
 "Taylor's Cube" - 13:58

 Disc 2 recorded live at The Basement in Sydney in January 1995.

Charts

Release history

References

1995 albums
Directions in Groove albums